The First Men in the Moon is a novel by H. G. Wells.

The First Men in the Moon may also refer to:
 A Trip to the Moon, a silent adaptation of the novel and Jules Verne's From the Earth to the Moon
 The First Men in the Moon (1919 film), silent adaptation of the novel
 First Men in the Moon (1964 film), film adaptation of the novel
 The First Men in the Moon (2010 film), television adaptation of the novel

See also
 Apollo 11, the NASA mission that sent the first men to the surface of the Moon
 Apollo 8, the NASA mission that sent the first men around the Moon
 Project Apollo, the NASA program that sent the first astronauts to the Moon
 Moon Race, the Cold War competition between the U.S.A. and U.S.S.R. to reach the Moon